Igor Anatolievich Potyakin (born 14 September 1955) is a retired Russian backstroke swimmer who won a bronze medal in the 4×100 m medley relay at the 1974 European Aquatics Championships. During his career he won six national titles in the 100 m (1973–1976) and 200 m backstroke (1974) and 4×100 m medley relay (1974).

He graduated from the Samara Polytechnic University. After retirement from senior swimming he competed in the masters category and won a national title in 1996.

References

1955 births
Living people
Russian male swimmers
Male backstroke swimmers
Soviet male swimmers
European Aquatics Championships medalists in swimming
Universiade medalists in swimming
Universiade silver medalists for the Soviet Union
Medalists at the 1973 Summer Universiade